The Canadian Council for Tobacco Control (CCTC) is a registered Canadian charity.  It formerly existed as the Canadian Council on Smoking and Health (CCSH).  It was founded in 1974 by several non-governmental organizations "concerned with the tobacco epidemic", including the Canadian Cancer Society, the Heart and Stroke Foundation of Canada, and the Canadian Lung Association. It coordinates Canada's National Non-Smoking Week.

See also 
 Tobacco control

External links
 Canadian Lung Association
 Canadian Council for Tobacco Control website
 Canada Revenue Agency registered charity information database
 Heart and Stroke Foundation of Canada official website

Tobacco control
Charities based in Canada
Smoking in Canada